The Minutes are a three-piece rock band from Dublin, Ireland consisting of Mark Austin, Tom Cosgrave & Shane Kinsella. Début album Marcata was released on 20 May 2011 in Ireland.

History (2006 - present)
The Minutes were formed in 2006 in Dublin, Ireland. Some of the band members previously played together under the name Stars of the City. After several years of performing live in Dublin, the band recorded their debut album in October 2009 at Marcata Recordings in Upstate New York. Together with producer Kevin McMahon, the band recorded a ten-track album that replicated the highlights of their live performances, including "Secret History", "Believer" and "In my Time of Dying".

On 3 March 2011, The Minutes appeared on Other Voices on RTÉ Two television in Ireland performing two of their songs off their debut album.

On Saturday 19 March 2011 they appeared on The Saturday Night Show, performing their single "Black Keys".

Their debut album Marcata was released on 20 May 2011 in Ireland.

The Minutes performed at the Eurosonic Festival in 2012 when Ireland was the "Spotlight Country".

Irish musician and DJ Rob Smith said that the band were "one of, if not then the finest rock & roll band to have ever come out of Ireland" in a 2013 interview.

Paul McLoone, a radio presenter with the Irish national and independent radio station, Today FM and also the frontman for the Northern Irish band, The Undertones who is also friends with the Minutes appeared in the video for the Minutes's single, "Cherry Bomb", playing an unnamed Elvis Impersonator with the video itself being released in March 2014.

Touring
The band have toured extensively in Ireland and the UK with Albert Hammond Jnr The Strokes, The Pigeon Detectives, The Von Bondies, Supergrass and Flogging Molly. Soon after a year long residency at Dublin’s live music staple, Whelans in 2009 The Minutes headed off to Marcata Recordings in upstate New York to record their debut album with producer Kevin McMahon. This was followed by a critically acclaimed performance at SXSW in Texas in March 2010. In November 2010, they supported The Parlotones in the O2 Shepherd's Bush Empire, London and, in December 2010, they supported Black Rebel Motorcycle Club in Belfast.

Touring 2011
 19 January Supported The Phantom Band in Whelans, Dublin.
 17 February Supported Mona in Whelans.
 20 March Supported The Wombats in The Academy, Dublin.
 9–24 April Supported Fight Like Apes on their tour of Ireland. 
 May Great Escape Festival Brighton, England
 June Supported The Cult on both Dublin shows
 June Irish Tour
 8–10 July played Oxegen.
 30 July played Castlepalooza, Tullamore.
 August Reading & Leeds Festivals UK
 23–24 August Supporting Flogging Molly in Dublin & Belfast.
 September Electric Picnic Festival Ireland
 15 October played Whelans, Dublin T
 October Irish Tour
 CMJ Festival NYC
 22–23 October Supporting Noel Gallagher's High Flying Birds Dublin, Olympia
 November - Extensive European tour supporting Flogging Molly
 December Headline German tour
 First official UK headline show, London

Band members
 Mark Austin - Lead Vocals & Rhythm Guitar
 Tom Cosgrave - Bass & Backing vocals
 Shane Kinsella - Drums & Backing vocals

Discography

Singles

Awards and nominations 

|-
| align="center"|2010
| align="center"|IMTV Awards
| align="center"|Best Group Video
|
|-
| align="center"|2011
| align="center"|Tunebreaker Awards
| align="center"|Best Newcomer
|
|-
| align="center"|2011
| align="center"|IMTV Awards
| align="center"|Best Live Video
|
|-
| align="center"|2011
| align="center"|IMTV Awards
| align="center"|Best Group Video
|
|-

References

External links
 Official Website

Musical groups established in 2006
Irish rock music groups
Musical groups from Dublin (city)